Van Meekeren is a Dutch surname. Notable people with the surname include:

 Job Janszoon van Meekeren (1611–1666), Dutch surgeon
 Paul van Meekeren (born 1993), Dutch cricketer

See also
 Van Meegeren

Dutch-language surnames